Graphium evemon, the blue jay, lesser jay, or pale green triangle is a species of tropical butterfly found in India, Indonesia, and Malaysia.

Subspecies
G. e. evemon Java
G. e. albociliatis  (Fruhstorfer, 1901)  (Assam - North Laos, North Vietnam)
G. e. igneolus (Fruhstorfer, 1901)  (Nias)
G. e. eventus (Fruhstorfer, 1908)   (South Burma, Thailand, Peninsular Malaya, Langkawi Island, Sumatra, Banka, Borneo)
G. e. orithia  Jordan, 1909   (Philippines (Mapun))
G. e. hetaerias (Jordan, 1937)  (Siberut)
G. evemon lebar (Page & Treadaway 2011)   Karimati Island, Indonesia

See also

Papilionidae
List of butterflies of India
List of butterflies of India (Papilionidae)

References

evemon
Butterflies of Asia
Butterflies of Indochina
Butterflies described in 1836